Glee is an American musical comedy-drama television series that aired on the Fox network in the United States. It focuses on the William McKinley High School glee club New Directions competing on the show choir competition circuit, while its members deal with relationships, sexuality and social issues. The show was created by Ryan Murphy, Brad Falchuk and Ian Brennan, and features many cover versions of songs performed on-screen by the characters. Murphy is responsible for selecting all of the songs used, and strives to maintain a balance between show tunes and chart hits, as he wants there to be "something for everybody in every episode". Once Murphy selects a song, rights are cleared with its publishers by music supervisor P.J. Bloom, and music producer Adam Anders rearranges it for the Glee cast. Numbers are pre-recorded by the cast, while choreographer Zach Woodlee constructs the accompanying dance moves, which are then taught to the cast and filmed. Studio recordings of tracks are then made. The process begins six to eight weeks before each episode is filmed, and can end as late as the day before filming begins.

At the beginning of the season, Murphy intended for the performances to remain reality-based, as opposed to having the characters spontaneously burst into song. As the season progressed, however, Glee began to utilize fantasy sequences, with paraplegic character Artie imagining himself dancing to "The Safety Dance", and six separate characters performing a fantasy version of "Like a Virgin". The first thirteen episodes of the season averaged five songs per episode. For the final nine episodes, the number of performances increased to eight. The list below contains all 131 musical performances of the first season, with each performance delivering an individual song or a mashup of two or more songs in a single performance. 

Murphy was surprised at the ease with which use of songs was approved by the record labels approached. Recording artist Rihanna offered her single "Take a Bow" for use at a reduced licensing rate, and other artists offered use of their songs free. Madonna granted the show rights to her entire catalog, and the 2010 episode "The Power of Madonna" featured cover versions of eight of her songs. A series of Glee albums were released through Columbia Records. Accompanying the first season were the studio albums Glee: The Music, Volume 1, Glee: The Music, Volume 2 and Glee: The Music, Volume 3 Showstoppers, extended plays (EP) Glee: The Music, The Power of Madonna and Glee: The Music, Journey to Regionals, and the compilation album Glee: The Music, The Complete Season One, featuring 100 recordings from the season. Songs featured on the show are available for digital download through the iTunes Store up to two weeks before new episodes air, and through other digital outlets and mobile carriers a week later.

Performers
The majority of songs are performed by New Directions, which is composed of Artie Abrams (Kevin McHale), Rachel Berry (Lea Michele), Mike Chang (Harry Shum, Jr.), Tina Cohen-Chang (Jenna Ushkowitz), Quinn Fabray (Dianna Agron), Finn Hudson (Cory Monteith), Kurt Hummel (Chris Colfer), Mercedes Jones (Amber Riley), Santana Lopez (Naya Rivera), Brittany Pierce (Heather Morris), Noah "Puck" Puckerman (Mark Salling) and Matt Rutherford (Dijon Talton). Club director Will Schuester (Matthew Morrison) also performs several songs. The season features some performances by rival glee clubs Vocal Adrenaline, which is sometimes led by Jesse St. James (Jonathan Groff), Jane Addams Girls Choir, Haverbrook Deaf Choir and Aural Intensity, as well as McKinley High's cheerleaders, the Cheerios, and the football team.

Guest stars who gave vocal performances during the season were Ben Bledsoe as former glee club member Hank Saunders, Jerry Phillips as a younger Finn, and Aaron Hendry as Darren in the pilot episode, Kristin Chenoweth and Neil Patrick Harris as former glee club members April Rhodes and Bryan Ryan, Zack Weinstein as Sean Fretthold, Olivia Newton-John as herself, Wendy Worthington as an auditionee for Les Misérables in "Dream On", and Idina Menzel as Vocal Adrenaline director Shelby Corcoran.

Songs included on the three soundtrack albums accompanying the season feature additional vocals by non-cast members. Adam Anders, Kamari Copeland, Tim Davis, Emily Gomez, David Loucks, Chris Mann and Windy Wagner appear on all three albums, as does Nikki Anders, née Hassman, who is credited as Hassman on the first two and Anders on the third; Zac Poor sings on the second and third albums. Jasper Randall appears on Glee: The Music, Volume 1, and David Baloche, Jenny Karr, Kerri Larson and Tiffany Palmer feature on Glee: The Music, Volume 2. Glee: The Music, Volume 3 Showstoppers features additional vocals by Kala Balch, David Baloche, Colin Benward, Ravaughn Brown, Storm Lee, Chaz Mason, Jeanette Olsen, Jimmy Andrew Richard, Drew Ryan Scott, Shelley Scarr and Onitsha Shaw. While recurring cast members Morris, Rivera, Shum, Jr., and Talton perform in the group numbers on screen, only Rivera is credited with performing vocally on any soundtrack albums or EPs, gaining her first solo part on "Like a Virgin" in the episode "The Power of Madonna", and appearing on Glee: The Music, Volume 3 Showstoppers as well as the two EPs, Glee: The Music, The Power of Madonna and Glee: The Music, Journey to Regionals.

Songs

See also
 List of songs in Glee (season 2)
 List of songs in Glee (season 3)
 List of songs in Glee (season 4)
 List of songs in Glee (season 5)
 List of songs in Glee (season 6)
 Glee albums discography

Notes

References

General
 
 
Glee: The Music, Volume 1 track list – 
Glee: The Music, Volume 2 track list – 
Glee: The Music, Volume 3 Showstoppers track list – 
Glee: The Music, The Power of Madonna track list – 
Glee: The Music, Journey to Regionals track list – 
Glee: The Music, Love Songs track list – 
Glee: The Music, The Complete Season One track list – 

Specific

Glee